Alice Sophie Cocéa or Cocea (28 July 1899 – 2 July 1970) was a Romanian-born French actress and singer. She was the sister of socialist journalist and novelist N. D. Cocea, and the aunt of actresses Dina and Tantzi Cocea.

Biography
Alice Cocéa was born in Sinaia, Prahova County, the daughter of Romanian Land Forces general Dimitrie Cocea. She had a sister, Florica (married Bressy), and a brother, Nicolae (the future N. D. Cocea).

She was married in 1926 to Count Stanislas de la Rochefoucauld, Duke of Bisaccia; the marriage ended in divorce in 1931. In 1932 her fiancé, Lieutenant Victor Point, a French explorer and nephew of Philippe Berthelot, killed himself when Cocéa declined to marry him; he died after shooting himself in the mouth. They had been involved for three years, and she had promised to become his wife once her divorce from Rochefoucauld had been settled. Cocéa announced her retirement shortly after Point's death, stating that she would join a convent. She did not return to the screen until the 1960s.

She was the mistress of Roger Capgras, a shady figure who rose from being a vegetable dealer to head of a major newspaper during the Nazi Occupation and later a fascist-leaning theatrical figure.

During World War II, Cocéa was arrested as a Nazi collaborator and later released. Her memoirs, Mes amours que j'ai tant aimées ("The Loves I So Loved"), were published in 1958. She died in Boulogne-Billancourt 12 years later.

Filmography
 My Childish Father (1930)
 Let's Get Married (1931)
Delphine (1931)
Atout coeur (1931)
 Nicole and Her Virtue (1932)
Greluchon délicat (1934)
Le joueur (1962)
Striptease (1963)
La ronde (1964)

External links

References

Romanian film actresses
French film actresses
People from Sinaia
Romanian expatriates in France
French people of Romanian descent
1899 births
1970 deaths
20th-century French actresses